Upe Atosu (born April 21, 1993) is a Nigerian basketball player for Butler Bulldogs women's basketball and the Nigerian national team.

She participated at the 2017 Women's Afrobasket.

References

1993 births
Living people
Nigerian women's basketball players
Sportspeople from Edo State
Guards (basketball)
African Games silver medalists for Nigeria
African Games medalists in basketball
Competitors at the 2015 African Games
21st-century Nigerian women